Involvulus hirtus is a species of leaf rolling weevil in the beetle family Attelabidae.

References

Further reading

 
 

Attelabidae
Articles created by Qbugbot
Beetles described in 1801